Bezenjan (also romanized as Bezenjān; also known as Bezenjānī, Bīzenjān, Bizinjān, and Now Bezenjān) is a city in the Central District of Baft County, Kerman Province, Iran.  At the 2006 census, its population was 4,417, in 1,112 families.
Boznjan is a mountainous city and one of the highest cities in Iran and has a rich historical background in Baft city of Kerman province (the largest province of Iran). The distance of this city to Baft city is 8 km and to Kerman metropolis is 151 km. The city is bounded on the north by Kiskan district, on the east by Rabar and Javaran districts, on the south and southwest by Dashtab district and on the west by Dashtab and Fatahabad districts. It is possible that the city dates back to ancient times B and early fifth century BC. Therefore, Boznjan is one of the areas with an ancient history. The people of this city have the closest genetic closeness with the eastern Aryans of Iran and are of Aryan descent who entered these areas from the east. First, Amirkabir, Tehran, 1989, p. 248) (Geography of Kerman, p. 248) (Historical geography of Baft and Rabar, 1390, p. 63)
Development of bezenjan has started from years ago , when Mohamad Naseri instituted first school there .

References

Populated places in Baft County

Cities in Kerman Province